LP on LP (Live Phish on Long Play) is a series of live albums by Vermont-based jam band Phish. The albums contain highlights from different Phish concerts, released on vinyl records. Due to the length of the typical Phish jam, all the albums so far have featured only one or two songs. Three volumes have been released thus far, with the first two being released on June 18, 2021 and the third on August 5, 2022.

LP on LP 01

The first release in the series, LP on LP 01, contains a performance of "Ruby Waves" recorded on July 14, 2019, during a concert at Alpine Valley Music Theatre in East Troy, Wisconsin. "Ruby Waves" first appeared on Ghosts of the Forest, a side project by Phish guitarist Trey Anastasio, and the 38-minute-plus version featured here is one of Phish's all-time longest jams. Made up of several distinct movements, the jam became known by fans as the "Alpine 'Ruby Waves'" and is the longest singular performance of the band's "3.0" era. The album was pressed on "ruby waves" colored vinyl. LP on LP 01 reached number 134 on the Billboard 200 and topped the magazine's Vinyl Albums chart.

Track listing

All tracks written by Trey Anastasio.

Side one

 "Ruby Waves" – 20:24

Side two

 "Ruby Waves (cont'd)" – 18:22

LP on LP 02

The second release in the series, LP on LP 02, contains a performance of "Waves" recorded on May 26, 2011, at Bethel Woods Center for the Arts in Bethel, New York. The jam, which quotes elements of John Coltrane's A Love Supreme, was not performed in front of an audience; rather it was the tech rehearsal for the band's run at the New York venue. LP on LP 02 reached number 138 on the Billboard 200 and number two on the Vinyl Albums chart.

Track listing

All tracks written by Anastasio, Scott Herman, and Tom Marshall.

Side one

 "Waves" – 14:15

Side two

 "Waves (cont'd)" – 14:23

LP on LP 03

LP on LP 03 contains a performance of "Tweezer" → "Prince Caspian" recorded on August 22, 2015, at Watkins Glen International in Watkins Glen, New York, as part of the band's "Magnaball" festival. The first in the series to contain more than one song, it was released on August 5, 2022 and was pressed on purple and light-blue "ferris wheel" colored vinyl. The release was less successful than the previous two installments, missing the Billboard 200 completely, but did reach number five on the Vinyl Albums chart.

Track listing

Side one

 "Tweezer" (Anastasio, Jon Fishman, Mike Gordon, Page McConnell) – 17:52 →

Side two

 "Prince Caspian" (Anastasio, Marshall) – 16:48

LP on LP 04

LP on LP 04 was released on January 13, 2023 and contains the band's performance of "Ghost" from Radio City Music Hall in New York, New York on May 22, 2000. The release is the first in the series to come from a show occurring before the band's hiatus and 2004 breakup. Clocking in at just over 28 minutes, it is the shortest release in the series thus far.

Track listing

All songs written by Trey Anastasio and Tom Marshall.

Side one

 "Ghost" – 16:10

Side two

 "Ghost (cont'd)" – 11:52

Personnel

Trey Anastasio – guitar, vocals
Mike Gordon – bass, vocals
Jon Fishman – drums, vocals
Page McConnell – piano, keyboards, vocals

References

Phish live albums